Michael Conway is a hurler with the Kerry county team.

References

http://www.sportsfile.com/id/182544/
http://munster.gaa.ie/winning-teams/jfclub_teams/

Year of birth missing (living people)
Living people
Kerry inter-county hurlers
Lixnaw hurlers
Fingue Gaelic footballers